Jagodnjak ((Croatian and Serbian pronunciation) ,) is a village and a municipality in the Osijek-Baranja County, Croatia. Landscape of the Jagodnjak Municipality is marked by the Drava river with surrounding wetland forest and by Pannonian Basin plains with agricultural fields of corn, wheat, common sunflower and sugar beet.

Jagodnjak is underdeveloped municipality which is statistically classified as the First Category Area of Special State Concern by the Government of Croatia.

Name

Jagodnjak name is derived from the Slavic word "jagoda" ("strawberry" in English), "jagodnjak" = "strawberry bed(s)/plot(s)/patch(es)/garden". In other languages, the village in German is known as Katschfeld and in Hungarian as Kácsfalu and is written as Јагодњак in Serbian Cyrillic.

Geography

The municipality of Jagodnjak includes the following settlements:
Bolman
Jagodnjak
Majške Međe
Novi Bolman

History
The first historical Municipality of Jagodnjak was established before the World War II during the epoch of the Kingdom of Hungary, and was settled by Danube Swabians from Hesse, they called Stifolder. At that time municipality was part of the Baranya County (former) and it did not include villages of Bolman, Novi Bolman and Majške Međe which were separate unit called the Municipality of Bolman.

Until the end of World War II, the Inhabitants was Danube Swabians. The former German Settlers was expelled to Germany and Austria in 1945-1948, about the Potsdam Agreement.

During the final stage of the World War II in March 1945 the village of Bolman was the spot of the Battle of Bolman in which Yugoslav Partisans (primarily multi-ethnic units from Vojvodina) and Red Army fought against Nazis. The monument to the battle was constructed in 1951 and in 1971 it was protected as a registered cultural heritage site. After the integration of the region under the central government rule in the late 1990s the monument to the battle was devastated in 1999 and 2000. The municipality initiated reconstruction efforts in 2002 and the work was not completed until 2013 when the Ministry of Culture of the Republic of Croatia provided funds for this purpose. The monument is allegedly target of intentional desecration with illegal waste disposal.

Modern day Municipality of Jagodnjak was established in 1998 with the support of the United Nations representatives in the final stage of the UNTAES transitional administration over the region of Eastern Slavonia, Baranja and Western Syrmia. It was created in order to ensure adequate Serb local self-government through the creation of municipalities in Eastern Slavonia in which the group constitute ethnic majority. Today Jagodnjak is only municipality in Croatian part of Baranya with an ethnic Serb majority. Together with other municipalities with Serb majority in Eastern Croatia it constitutes the Joint Council of Municipalities.

Demographics

Population
There are 2,537 inhabitants in the municipality (2001 census), including: 
Serbs (64.72%)
Croats (26.65%)
Hungarians (2.88%)
Romani (1.18%)

Before World War II there was a substantial Danube Swabian minority here but they were all expelled by the Communist regime of Josip Broz Tito after 1945.

Languages

Due to the local minority population, the Jagodnjak municipality prescribe the use of not only Croatian as the official language, but the Serbian language and Serbian Cyrillic alphabet as well.

Religion

Politics

Joint Council of Municipalities
The Municipality of Jagodnjak is one of seven Serb majority member municipalities within the Joint Council of Municipalities, inter-municipal sui generis organization of ethnic Serb community in eastern Croatia established on the basis of Erdut Agreement. As Serb community constitute majority of the population of the municipality it is represented by 2 delegated Councillors at the Assembly of the Joint Council of Municipalities, double the number of Councilors to the number from Serb minority municipalities in Eastern Croatia.

Notable natives and residents
 József Angster
Maja Dombi

See also 
 Osijek-Baranja County
 Baranja
 Joint Council of Municipalities
 Church of St Nicholas, Jagodnjak
 List of Croatian municipalities with minority languages in official use

References

External links 

 Official website 

Populated places in Osijek-Baranja County
Municipalities of Croatia
Baranya (region)
Joint Council of Municipalities
Serb communities in Croatia